Akiyama is a Japanese surname.

Akiyama may also refer to:

Akiyama, Yamanashi, Japan
Akiyama clan, Japanese clan mainly originating during the Sengoku Period of the 16th century
2153 Akiyama, asteroid
Akiyama Jin Kyouju Kanshuu: Zennou JinJin, Nintendo DS brain training game
"Autumn Mountain", aka "Akiyama", a short story by Ryūnosuke Akutagawa